Best of Soulhead: 5th Anniversary Tour (stylized as 5th Anniversary tour "BEST OF SOULHEAD") is Soulhead's second concert DVD and third DVD overall. The tour coincided with their album Best of Soulhead and consisted of twenty-four songs performed at each location. The concert placed on the DVD was performed at Zepp Tokyo on May 27, 2007. During the tour, each sister performed a new song: Yoshika performed YOSHIKA Solo and Tsugumi performed Street Walking during her rap medley.

The DVD charted at #77 on Oricon and remained on the charts for two weeks.

Track listing
(Official Track List)
"Theme of Soulhead"
"At the Party"
"Step to the New World"
"Get Up!"
"Lover, Knight, Man"
"Got to leave"
"No Way"
"You can do that"
"キミノキセキ"
"いつまでも…"
"Yoshika Solo"
"Playboy"
"A pretense of love"
"いつでも君のことを"
"Tsugumi Solo ~Rap Medley~ (Street Walking / WHACHAGONADO? / D.O.G / To Da Fake MCs / WOO! / Too Late / Stay There)"
"Soulhead is Back"
"Fiesta"
"XXX"
"Feel Like Jumping"
"Pray"
"Sparkle☆Train"
"Oh My Sister"Encore
"Dear Friends"
"空"

References

2007 video albums
Albums recorded at Zepp Tokyo
Sony Music Entertainment Japan albums
Live video albums